Deliv Inc. was a Menlo Park-based crowdshipping, same-day delivery startup Deliv provided last mile transportation services. Deliv was founded in 2012 by Daphne Carmeli, who also served as CEO of the company, and offered same-day service to mall shoppers.

Deliv raised $12.35 million in funding from the four largest mall operators in the U.S., as well as General Catalyst, Redpoint Ventures, Trinity Ventures, Operators Fund and PivotNorth. Deliv's drivers were required to undergo an extensive filtering process. In 2017, the company announced an expansion of its service to 33 markets and 1,400 cities, up from 19 markets previously.

In May 2020, Deliv announced it was shutting down and Target Corporation announced plans to acquire Deliv's technology assets with Carmeli and a number of Deliv engineers joining the retailer. Target had previously acquired delivery companies Shipt and Grand Junction both in 2017.

See also 

 Shipt: another delivery company acquired by Target Corporation
 Gig worker: Deliv employed workers as part of the "gig economy"
 Roadie (app): Similar, still operating service in the US

References 

Companies based in Menlo Park, California
Logistics companies of the United States
2012 establishments in California
Transportation companies based in California